Lundensian theology refers to the younger school of Lutheran theology and Luther research in Lund University. Its representatives were Anders Nygren, Gustaf Aulén and Ragnar Bring. Significant works of the Lundensian school have been Christus Victor and Agape and Eros.

External links
Lund, Theology of, article in Christian Cyclopedia
Lundensian Theology by Wesley J. Wildman, 1988

Lutheran theology
Christian theological movements